Taiwan Daily was a daily newspaper based in Taiwan that began circulation on 25 October 1964 and ended on 6 June 2006. It now exists as an online publication.

Features 
The Taiwan Daily was usually published as broadsheet in full color, excepting classified ads and extended articles. It was divided into five sections, General News, United States and Community, Leisure and Living, Sports, and Advertisements. As is characteristic of Taiwan Paparazzi, articles usually featured comprehensive biographies covering celebrities' height and weight, as well as provocative pictures of strippers and celebrity relations.

History 
Taiwan Daily was founded on 25 October 1964, as Oriental Daily (東方日報), in Keelung. In 1976 the paper was renamed Taiwan Daily, amongst semantic criticism. By that time, the Daily had reached 300,000 copies in circulation, and was Taiwan's largest newspaper. It ceased publication on 6 June 2006.

As of 2018, it exists as an online publication.

External links
 Taiwan Daily official website: now transferred to a Los Angeles-based newspaper of the same name, previously in franchise with the Taiwan-based newspaper.

1964 establishments in Taiwan
2006 disestablishments in Taiwan
Online newspapers with defunct print editions
Defunct newspapers published in Taiwan
Publications established in 1964
Publications disestablished in 2006
Chinese-language newspapers (Traditional Chinese)